Stagecoach in Warwickshire is a bus operator in and around the county of Warwickshire. It is a subsidiary of Stagecoach.

History
In 1927, Stratford-on-Avon Motor Services commenced operating a service between Stratford-on-Avon and Royal Leamington Spa.

In June 1935, Midland Red purchased Stratford Blue but continued to operate under its own identity until January 1971 when the National Bus Company integrated the Stratford Blue operation into Midland Red.

In September 1981, Midland Red South was formed with 163 buses operating from five depots in Buckinghamshire, Northamptonshire, Oxfordshire and Warwickshire.

In December 1987, Midland Red South was sold in a management buyout to Western Travel Group, which also owned Cheltenham & Gloucester Omnibus. During Western Travel ownership, Midland Red South opened a garage in Coventry, and also revived the Statford Blue name.

In 1993, Western Travel was sold to Stagecoach who re-branded part of it as Stagecoach Midland Red. It set about simplifying the routes and improving the profitability of the operation, which included the closure of the depots in Coventry and Stratford in 1999. Upon national re-branding in 2000, Stagecoach Midland Red became Stagecoach in Warwickshire for operations from Leamington, Nuneaton and Rugby and Stagecoach in Banbury for operations in Banbury. For a long time Midland Red shared a management team with Stagecoach Oxford, but this was split in July 2002 with the Banbury operations becoming part of Stagecoach in Oxfordshire. 

Meanwhile, Guide Friday, an operator of sight-seeing tours in Stratford had established a small number of local and tendered bus services in the town following Stagecoach's departure. This company was eventually purchased by Ensignbus, who rebranded the Stratford services by once again reviving the Stratford Blue fleetname. 

In February 2007, Stagecoach purchased the Stratford operation from Ensignbus, once again giving them a depot in the town. On 12 November 2007, Stagecoach in Warwickshire introduced the second Stagecoach Goldline service in the UK, on route 66 (renumbered G1) between South Farm, Leamington Spa and Warwick, using Optare Solos.

The 'Unibus' brand is used for services operating predominantly between Leamington Spa and the University of Warwick, mainly direct via the A46, although variations exist at weekends.

In 2010 - Stagecoach in Warwickshire merged with Stagecoach East and Stagecoach in Northants to create Stagecoach Midlands. The Warwickshire HQ was moved from Rugby to Northampton after a management restructure.  However the legal name for the Warwickshire operations remains as Midland Red (South) Ltd. with the other Stagecoach Midlands operations maintaining the historic legal name of United Counties Omnibus Company Ltd..

Depots
Stagecoach in Warwickshire operate depots in Leamington Spa, Nuneaton, Rugby and Stratford-upon-Avon.

See also
List of bus operators of the United Kingdom

References

External links

Company website

Stagecoach Group bus operators in England
Transport in Warwickshire